The WxChallenge is a weather forecasting competition among colleges in North America.  The competition is run by the University of Oklahoma.  In its first official semester, fall 2006, there were 1,262 participants from 53 institutions. A similar competition, the National Collegiate Weather Forecasting Contest, recently ended, partially due to this competition.

Organization
Entrants in the contest must be affiliated with a college or university, but they range in age and knowledge from undergraduates to professors.  Each semester, 5 cities are picked for forecasting; the current city changes every 2 weeks.  Contestants forecast 4 days per week for the following day's high temperature (in Fahrenheit), low temperature, maximum sustained wind speed (in knots) and precipitation (in 1/100ths of an inch).

One "error" point is given for each degree of error on temperature, 1/2 an error point is given for each knot of wind speed error.

Precipitation is scored as follows:
0.4 points for each .01 inch of error in the verification range from 0.00 to 0.10 inches inclusive 
0.3 points for each .01 inch of error in the verification range from 0.11 to 0.25 inches inclusive 
0.2 points for each .01 inch of error in the verification range from 0.26 to 0.50 inches inclusive 
0.1 points for each .01 inch of error in the verification range over 0.50 inches

At the end of the competition, the top 64 forecasters continue into a "March Madness" like tournament where a champion is crowned.  A trophy is given to the champion, as well as the runner-up and the other two forecasters who make it to the "Final Four".

Winners
2006-07: Massachusetts Institute of Technology
2007-08: Massachusetts Institute of Technology
2008-09: Mississippi State University
2009-10: Mississippi State University
2010-11: Mississippi State University
2011-12: Pennsylvania State University
2012-13: Pennsylvania State University
2013-14: Pennsylvania State University
2014-15: Pennsylvania State University
2015-16: Pennsylvania State University
2016-17: Pennsylvania State University
2017-18: Colorado State University
2018-19: University of Washington

See also

 List of meteorology awards

Sources
 https://wxchallenge.com/tools/trophyroom.php

References

External links
Official WxChallenge Website

Meteorology competitions
University of Oklahoma